The Sulu hornbill (Anthracoceros montani), or Montano's hornbill, is a species of hornbill in the family Bucerotidae. It is endemic to the Sulu archipelago in the Philippines, with the remaining populations in Tawi-Tawi with it believed to be hunted to extinction on Jolo.  Its natural habitat is tropical moist  forests. It is threatened by habitat loss as well as potential harvesting for food. Its diet includes fruit, insects, and small lizards.

In 2019 it was reported that only 27 mature individual hornbills are still believed to be alive in the wild making it one of the most endangered animals in the world.

Description 
EBird describes the bird as "A large bird of lowland and montane forest on the Sulu Islands, although probably only remaining on Tawi-Tawi. Feeds particularly on fig trees. One of the rarest birds in the world. Entirely black except for a white tail. Has a long, thick black bill, a black casque, and black bare skin around the eye. Male has pale eyes and female has brown eyes and a smaller casque. Unmistakable. The only hornbill in its range. Voice is a nasal cackling."

Habitat and Conservation Status 
It inhabits primary dipterocarp forest, typically on mountain slopes (although this may simply reflect a constraint enforced by forest loss), occasionally visiting isolated fruiting trees over 1 km from the nearest forest. It requires large trees for nesting. Whilst the species's diet mainly consists of fruit, small lizards and some insects may also be consumed.

IUCN has assessed this bird as critically endangered.  In 2019 it was reported that only 27 mature individual hornbills are still believed to be alive in the wild. This makes it the most endangered hornbill and one of the most endangered animals in the entire world. It has gone extinct on the island of Jolo, due to hunting and the remaining populations in Tawi-Tawi are threatened by habitat destruction through logging and slash-and-burn farming.

References

Sulu hornbill
Endemic birds of the Philippines
Fauna of Sulu
Fauna of Tawi-Tawi
Fauna of Basilan
Sulu hornbill
Taxonomy articles created by Polbot